Chinmaya Gharekhan (born July 4, 1934) is a former Indian diplomat.

Early life
Chinmaya Gharekhan was born on July 4, 1934 in Dabhoi, a village in the Indian state of Gujarat. He was one of 4 children born in a well off family. His father, Dr. Rajaninath Gharekhan was a civil surgeon to the former state of Baroda (now Vadodara.)

Career
He served as Chairman of International Control Commission in Laos from 1973 - 1975, Indian Ambassador to Vietnam from 1975–1976, Indian Ambassador to the United Nations in Geneva from 1977 - 1980, Advisor on Foreign Affairs to the Prime Minister of India from 1981 - 1986.

He served as India's Permanent Representative to the United Nations, and was elected to be the President  of the United Nations Economic and Social Council in 1990.

In January 1993 was appointed by the UN Secretary General as a special envoy to the Middle East peace process in the capacity of Under-Secretary-General of the United Nations, a position he held until 1999. From 2005 - 2009 he served as Special Envoy of India for the Middle East.

He was President of the Indira Gandhi National Centre for the Arts.

Currently, he is the Chairman of Bharatiya Vidya Bhavan, Delhi Kendra.

External links
 A brief bio of Gharekhan
 another biography
 Chinmaya Gharekhan at the World Affairs Council of Northern California
 UN Envoy Seeks to Break Impasse Over Israel's Expulsion of Muslims

References

Ambassadors of India to Vietnam
Permanent Representatives of India to the United Nations
Living people
1934 births
Indian officials of the United Nations
Special Envoys of the Secretary-General of the United Nations

es:Chinmaya Rajaninath Gharekhan